In the NUTS (Nomenclature of Territorial Units for Statistics) codes of Luxembourg (LU), the three levels are:

NUTS codes
LU0 Luxembourg
LU00 Luxembourg
LU000 Luxembourg

Local administrative units

Below the NUTS levels, the two LAU (Local Administrative Units) levels are:

The LAU codes of Luxembourg can be found in this spread sheet of all 28 EU member states LAU codes here, current as of 2018:

See also
 Subdivisions of Luxembourg
 ISO 3166-2 codes of Luxembourg
 FIPS region codes of Luxembourg

Sources
 Hierarchical list of the Nomenclature of territorial units for statistics - NUTS and the Statistical regions of Europe
 Overview map of EU Countries - NUTS level 1
 LUXEMBOURG - NUTS level 2
 LUXEMBOURG - NUTS level 3
 Correspondence between the NUTS levels and the national administrative units
 List of current NUTS codes
 Download current NUTS codes (ODS format)

Luxembourg
Nuts